Boesmans River is a river in the Eastern Cape, South Africa. It originates north of Kirkwood and runs east past Alicedale, before it turns and twists south and east to Kenton on Sea, where it mouths into the Indian Ocean through a tidal estuary only 1.7 km to the SW of the mouth of the Kariega River.

Tributaries
Its tributaries include: Bega River, iCamtarha, Ncazala River, Komga River, New Years River, Steins River, Swartwaters River, Soutkloof River and Bou River.

See also 
 List of rivers of South Africa

References

External links
Boesmansriviermond
 Google Map of Boesman River's mouth at Geonames.org (cc-by)

Rivers of the Eastern Cape